Usovo is the name of several rural localities in Russia.

Modern localities

Arkhangelsk Oblast
As of 2012, one rural locality in Arkhangelsk Oblast bears this name:
Usovo, Arkhangelsk Oblast, a village in Zabelinsky Selsoviet of Kotlassky District

Ivanovo Oblast
As of 2012, one rural locality in Ivanovo Oblast bears this name:
Usovo, Ivanovo Oblast, a village in Puchezhsky District

Kaluga Oblast
As of 2012, one rural locality in Kaluga Oblast bears this name:
Usovo, Kaluga Oblast, a village in Kozelsky District

Moscow Oblast
As of 2012, one rural locality in Moscow Oblast bears this name:
Usovo, Moscow Oblast, a selo in Barvikhinskoye Rural Settlement of Odintsovsky District;

Oryol Oblast
As of 2012, one rural locality in Oryol Oblast bears this name:
Usovo, Oryol Oblast, a village in Lomovsky Selsoviet of Zalegoshchensky District

Pskov Oblast
As of 2012, five rural localities in Pskov Oblast bear this name:
Usovo, Krasnogorodsky District, Pskov Oblast, a village in Krasnogorodsky District
Usovo, Nevelsky District, Pskov Oblast, a village in Nevelsky District
Usovo (Gorayskaya Rural Settlement), Ostrovsky District, Pskov Oblast, a village in Ostrovsky District; municipally, a part of Gorayskaya Rural Settlement of that district
Usovo (Berezhanskaya Rural Settlement), Ostrovsky District, Pskov Oblast, a village in Ostrovsky District; municipally, a part of Berezhanskaya Rural Settlement of that district
Usovo, Sebezhsky District, Pskov Oblast, a village in Sebezhsky District

Rostov Oblast
As of 2012, one rural locality in Rostov Oblast bears this name:
Usovo, Rostov Oblast, a settlement in Sulinskoye Rural Settlement of Millerovsky District

Tambov Oblast
As of 2012, one rural locality in Tambov Oblast bears this name:
Usovo, Tambov Oblast, a village in Grazhdanovsky Selsoviet of Bondarsky District

Tver Oblast
As of 2012, two rural localities in Tver Oblast bear this name:
Usovo, Kimrsky District, Tver Oblast, a village in Ustinovskoye Rural Settlement of Kimrsky District
Usovo, Rzhevsky District, Tver Oblast, a village in Itomlya Rural Settlement of Rzhevsky District

Tyumen Oblast
As of 2012, one rural locality in Tyumen Oblast bears this name:
Usovo, Tyumen Oblast, a selo in Usovsky Rural Okrug of Sladkovsky District

Vologda Oblast
As of 2012, two rural localities in Vologda Oblast bear this name:
Usovo, Spassky Selsoviet, Vologodsky District, Vologda Oblast, a village in Spassky Selsoviet of Vologodsky District
Usovo, Veprevsky Selsoviet, Vologodsky District, Vologda Oblast, a village in Veprevsky Selsoviet of Vologodsky District

Yaroslavl Oblast
As of 2012, three rural localities in Yaroslavl Oblast bear this name:
Usovo, Danilovsky District, Yaroslavl Oblast, a village in Gorinsky Rural Okrug of Danilovsky District
Usovo, Nekouzsky Rural Okrug, Nekouzsky District, Yaroslavl Oblast, a village in Nekouzsky Rural Okrug of Nekouzsky District
Usovo, Shestikhinsky Rural Okrug, Nekouzsky District, Yaroslavl Oblast, a village in Shestikhinsky Rural Okrug of Nekouzsky District

Alternative names
Usovo, alternative name of Usovka, a village in Andreyevsky Selsoviet of Sergachsky District in Nizhny Novgorod Oblast;